Poiana Blenchii is a commune located in Sălaj County, Transylvania, Romania. It is composed of four villages: Fălcușa (Falkosány), Gostila (Csicsógombás), Măgura (Kishegy) and Poiana Blenchii.

Sights 
 Wooden church in Măgura (c. 1707), historic monument

References

Communes in Sălaj County
Localities in Transylvania